Shuinan railway station is a railway station in Yanping District, Nanping, Fujian, China. It handles freight trains, and previously handled passenger services.

History
The final passenger service ran on 9 January 2016. On 15 December 2019, the name of this station was changed from Nanping to Shuinan.

References

Railway stations in Fujian